

References

Sources

 
 

 

 

 

 

 

Lists of weapons
Germanic heroic legends